The Benbow Inn, in Garberville, California, is a hotel built in 1926.

It was an early hotel on the Redwood Highway;  it was originally called the Hotel Benbow.

The Benbow Inn was listed on the National Register of Historic Places in 1983.

It was built of Douglas fir and is Tudor Revival in style.

It is a member of the Historic Hotels of America.

History
The Benbow Historic Inn was designed by architect Albert Farr, who was famous for designing The Wolf House for novelist Jack London.  The Benbow family built the hotel, the Benbow Dam, Power Company, as well as the nearby RV Park and Golf Course as part of their resort community along the Redwood Highway. 

The Benbow Inn was host to Hollywood's elite and other high standing political guests, offering them fine dining, horseback riding, golfing, hiking, swimming, boating, and fishing in the nearby Eel River.

References

External links

		
National Register of Historic Places in Humboldt County, California
Buildings and structures completed in 1926
Hotels in California
Buildings and structures in Humboldt County, California
Historic Hotels of America